The 1997–98 Slovenian Ice Hockey League was the seventh season of the Slovenian Hockey League. Olimpija won the league championships.

First round

Final round

Group A

Group B

Play-offs

Final
Olimpija (1) – Jesenice (2): 4–0 (4–3, 4–3, 7–2, 2–1)

3rd place
Bled (3) – Slavija (4): 3–0 (4–1, 8–2, 5–4)

External links
Slovenian league 1997–98

1997–98 in Slovenian ice hockey
Slovenia
Slovenian Ice Hockey League seasons